Rang Maza Vegla is an Indian Marathi soap opera that airs on Star Pravah. It premiered on 30 October 2019. It is an official remake of Malayalam TV series Karuthamuthu.

Plot 
It is the love story of young girl Deepa. Soundarya Inamdar is the owner of 'Satej Kanti' business. For Soundarya, looks are the most important feature of a person due to her past incident. That's why she hates dark skinned people. Deepa's mother passed away in an accident while saving childhood Kartik when she was a nurse then her father Shridhar marries Radha. They have daughter named Shweta, who hates Deepa because of her dark skin tone. Shweta is 'Wheatish' in the house. On the other hand, Kartik is the son of Soundarya who is sensible and intelligent, according to him looking beautiful is not the only thing that should matters.

Kartik meets Deepa and falls in love because of her kind behaviour towards people. Deepa helps a man on road suffering from acidity but she took it as a heart problem and took him to Aaditya hospital with the help of Kartik. Deepa donates blood in Kartik's Hospital due to lack of blood in blood bank and was urgently needed for the patient. Deepa signed a form of eye donation after listening to the Kartik advising to the people during a camp. Kartik praises Deepa and compliments that her eyes are so beautiful.

Kartik and Deepa frequently encounter each other and Kartik is impressed by Deepa's kindness and generosity. Saundarya arranges 'Mrs Dombivali ' competition only for fairer girls because she will marry a winner girl to the Kartik. Shweta wins the competition, and Saundarya fixed Kartik's marriage with Shweta. But Kartik refused to marry Shweta. Aditya loves Shweta and then Saundarya fixed Aditya and Shweta's marriage. Shweta thinks her marriage fixed with Kartik and she continuously flirt with him, but Kartik only loves Deepa. Then Deepa introduced a maid of Devkule house by Radha behind Deepa's father, and Deepa also accept it because of Shweta's happiness.

At Shweta Aditya's engagement Saundarya knows Deepa's reality that she is Shweta's sister then she called of engagement. After so many circumstances Kartik married with Deepa at temple. Saundarya refused to accept the marriage, she accept it only because she doesn't want Kartik leave the house and planned with Radha and Shweta that she wants their marriage with all the rituals and at marriage Shweta marries Kartik instead of Deepa. But with the help of Lavanya (Saundarya's daughter) Kartik married Deepa and Saundarya, Radha and Shweta get shocked. When Deepa and Kartik knows that Saundarya doesn't accept Deepa as her daughter -in-law, they planned to find Saundarya's past.

In Saundarya's younger age a man named 'Leeladhar Kale' who has dark skinned. Cheated on Saundarya's father and hanged Saundarya's mother and father. After that incident she hates dark skinned people. Deepa and Kartik finds Leeladhar but he attacks Kartik. Kartik get injured and admitted in hospital.

A new character, Dr. Tanuja Mantri is introduced. She was Kartik's college friend. She operates Kartik and get him well. When Saundarya knows the truth she slapped Deepa and makes her away from Kartik.  But, because of Kartik's happiness she permitted Deepa in house. Soundarya likes Tanuja as she is fair-skinned. Radha manipulates Saundarya about Deepa's mother Shalini that she is the main culprit behind younger Kartik's accident and Mai's (Saundarya's namesake mother)condition and also the helper of  Leeladhar in his bad deeds, but in reality she saves Kartik and Mai. In all this car hits her and she dies.  Saundarya decides Shweta and Aditya's marriage, at their marriage Saundarya blames Deepa and her mother. Then Deepa leaves house to prove her mother innocent. She meets Leeladhar and wants him to tell Saundarya the truth. But Leeladhar attacks Saundarya. Then Saundarya hates Deepa more.

Tanuja gets angry when she learns that Kartik is married with Deepa, with the help of Saundarya, Tanuja tries to creates misunderstanding between Deepa and Kartik. She also tries to creates a doubt in Kartik's mind about Deepa is in affair with her childhood friend Sujay. She harmed Mai (Saundarya's namesake mother) and makes everyone accuse Deepa of it. Kartik also blames Deepa, She threw out from the house by Saundarya. Later Deepa proves she is innocent and Tanuja is behind all of this. Kartik threw out Tanuja from the house.

Shweta wants to become a model but Saundarya wants her an ideal daughter-in-law first then she helps in her modeling career. But in any circumstances she will become a model and provoke Aditya against his family but Saundarya knows her bad deeds and threw her out from the house. She brought back in house by Deepa because of her fake pregnancy. Later Deepa is expecting a twins, but Saundarya doesn't want Deepa becomes a mother. Because she thought that her babies born in black colour. But later she is agreed with the help of Sujay. But she wants Deepa's babies born like Kartik not like Deepa. Then Shweta ends her fake pregnancy and tells everyone that she is miscarriage.

Later Deepa hosts a programme 'Sawale Sundar' in that a dark skinned people share their story to the other about how society behaves with them because of their dark skinned. Saundarya knows about this and she insults Deepa in ongoing programme but Deepa gives befitting reply to her about real beauty, Saundarya takes it's her insult. Shweta wants to kill Deepa's unborn child then Deepa slapped her and lock her in room, there she finds a Kartik's fake file made by Tanuja that Kartik will not to become a father, and plotting against Deepa and Kartik. At one side Mai tells Saundarya that Shalini is not a culprit she is saviour of Kartik and Saundarya becomes change of heart about Deepa and she arranges Deepa's Godbharai. On the other side Kartik knows that he can't be a father and doubts on Deepa and Sujay' relationship and at Godbharai he tells everyone that Deepa is expecting with Sujay's child, and he wants Deepa to dons a DNA test but Deepa denies and leaves house.

Deepa lives with Mr & Mrs Athavale in village, where she starts a tiffin service to earn money. A new girl enters in Kartik's life named Aayesha, she and her mother Mrs Deshmukh actually takes a revenge from Saundarya because, Saundarya rejects Aayesha's sisters proposal for Kartik due to her dark skinned. Saundarya tries her hard to close Deepa and Kartik together but she failed. With the help of Sujay, Saundarya planned Deepa and Kartik's divorce, due to that they starts living together for one month and she clears their misunderstandings. Shweta hires a goon and tries poisoning Deepa but Deepa is running out from there.

Deepa delivers a twin girls, one is fair and another is dark skinned. Saundarya takes a dark skinned baby with her in house in Deepa's memory and tells everyone she adopts baby and Kartik would be her father. Initially Kartik denies but later he accept. Nurse tells Deepa that her one baby dies in her womb because Saundarya force her to lie Deepa about it. Deepa with her daughter lives with Ashwini, a nurse in Aditya hospital. Deepa names her daughter as Kartiki while Saundarya names other daughter as Deepika. On the other side Kartik wants to married with Aayesha but Saundarya is against it. So Kartik tries to married with Aayesha in temple but in meantime Deepa stops the marriage and their marriage get called of but Kartik insults Deepa and tells her to leave.

8 years later
Kartiki and Deepika are grown up. Kartiki lives a simple life in village with Deepa while Deepika lives a rich life in Mumbai with all Inamdar family. Deepa shifts Mumbai again for her treatment of lungs disease because of Kartiki's force. Kartiki and Deepika enroll to same school and they both become friends. Aayesha waits for Kartiki past 8 years for marriage but everytime Saundarya stops them. Saundarya doesn't stops her attempt to close Deepa and Kartik. She tries to find Deepa from past 8 years but everytime she get failed. Finally Deepa and Kartik get face of in court where Deepa stops their divorce, but Aayesha kidnapped Kartiki so Deepa can get ready to divorce Kartik and finally their divorce get filed in the court.

Cast

Main 
 Reshma Shinde as Deepa Devkule Inamdar – Shrirang's daughter; Radha's step-daughter; Shweta's half-sister; Kartik's wife; Kartiki and Deepika's mother. 
 Ashutosh Gokhale as Kartik Inamdar – Saundarya and Lalit's elder son; Lavanya and Aditya's brother; Deepa's husband; Kartiki and Deepika's father.

Recurring 
Kartik's family
 Anushka Pimputkar as Kartiki Inamdar – Deepa and Kartik's elder daughter; Deepika's twin sister (2023–present) 
 Saisha Bhoir / Maitreyi Date as Young Kartiki Inamdar (2021-2023)
 Tanishka Vishe as Deepika Inamdar – Deepa and Kartik's elder daughter; Kartiki's twin sister (2023–present)
 Spruha Dali as Young Deepika Inamdar (2021-2023)
 Harshada Khanvilkar as Saundarya Inamdar – Lalit's wife, Lavanya, Kartik and Aditya's mother; Kartiki and Deepika's grandmother
 Shrirang Deshmukh as Lalit Inamdar – Saundarya's husband; Lavanya, Kartik and Aditya's father; Kartiki and Deepika's grandfather
 Ambar Ganpule / Bhagyesh Patil as Aditya Inamdar – Saundarya and Lalit's younger son; Lavanya and Kartik's brother; Shweta's husband
 Anagha Bhagare as Shweta Devkule Inamdar – Shrirang and Radha's daughter; Deepa's half-sister; Aditya's wife
 Shalmalee Tolye as Lavanya Inamdar – Saundarya and Lalit's daughter; Kartik and Aditya's sister

Deepa's family
 Pournima Talwalkar as Radha Devkule – Shrirang's second wife; Shweta's mother; Deepa's step-mother; Kartiki and Deepika's step-grandmother
 Gautam Murudeshwar as Shrirang Devkule – Radha's husband; Deepa and Shweta's father; Kartiki and Deepika's grandfather
 Vandana Marathe as Mrs. Devkule – Shrirang's mother; Shweta and Deepa's grandmother

Others
 Abhidnya Bhave as Tanuja Mantri – Kartik's colleague and obsessive lover
 Vidisha Mhaskar as Ayesha Deshmukh – Kartik's ex-fiancé
 Meghan Jadhav as Aaryan – Kartiki's friend
 Nikhil Rajeshirke as Sujay – Deepa's friend
 Manasi Ghate as Sakshi – Deepa's friend
 Vaishali Bhosale as Ashwini – Deepa's friend
 Amruta Bane as Nikita – Saundarya's assistant
 Rujuta Deshmukh as Sudha Athawale – Deepa's helper
 Shirish Joshi as Mr. Athawale – Sudha's husband; Deepa's helper
 Priya Kambale / Chitra Gadgil as Mrs. Deshmukh – Ayesha's mother

Guests 
 Nandita Patkar as Sarita from Sahkutumb Sahaparivar at Deepa's Haldi Ceremony
 Supriya Pathare as Ambika from Molkarin Bai - Mothi Tichi Sawali

Production 
This show was announced by Right Click Media Solutions on Star Pravah as an official adaptaion of Malayalam TV series Karuthamuthu. Reshma Shinde and Ashutosh Gokhale were signed as the leads. Pudhcha Paaul fame Harshada Khanvilkar was roped to play the lead antagonist Saundarya Inamdar. Actress Anagha Bhagare, Ambar Ganpule, Pournima Talwalkar, Abhidnya Bhave were roped in for prominent roles. Actress Vidisha Mhaskar was roped in to play the negative lead Ayesha.

As the series progressed, Harshada Khanvilkar's charecter became positive while Ashutosh Gokhale's charecter turned negative. Saisha Bhoir and Spruha Dali were introduced as Kartik and Deepa's twin daughter Kartiki and Deepika. Soon, Saisha was replaced by Maitreyi Date. 

A 14 years generation leap was introduced on 5th March 2023 when Maitreyi Date was replaced by Anushka Pimputkar as elder Kartiki and Spruha Dali was replaced by Tanishka Vishe as elder Deepika. 
Since 30 January 2023, the series is being produced by Shashi Mittal and Sumeet Mittal under their production house Shashi Sumeet Productions. This show is popular amongst its audience. The show maintain its TRP in Top 5 Marathi TV shows.

Reception

Mahaepisode (1 hour) 
 30 October 2019
 29 December 2019
 16 February 2020
 23 February 2020
 15 March 2020
 20 September 2020
 25 October 2020
 22 November 2020
 3 January 2021
 24 January 2021
 14 February 2021
 7 March 2021
 1 August 2021
 26 September 2021
 24 October 2021
 26 December 2021
 20 February 2022
 19 June 2022
 21 August 2022
 4 September 2022
 30 October 2022
 20 November 2022
 5 March 2023

Ratings

Adaptations

Awards

References

External links 
 
 Rang Maza Vegla at Disney+ Hotstar

Marathi-language television shows
2019 Indian television series debuts
Star Pravah original programming